Irina Viktorovna Lobacheva (born 18 February 1973) is a Russian former competitive ice dancer. With partner and former husband Ilia Averbukh, she is the 2002 Olympic silver medalist, the 2002 World champion and the 2003 European champion.

Career 
Lobacheva and Averbukh teamed up in 1992 after falling in love while skating in the same group but with different partners.

After the Goodwill Games in the summer of 1994 their coaches moved to Delaware, USA, with many of their students to train at the University of Delaware. A year later, Lobacheva / Averbukh joined them.

In September 2001, Lobacheva injured her left knee in training, causing them to miss the Grand Prix season. They won the silver medal at the 2002 Olympics behind Marina Anissina / Gwendal Peizerat.

Lobacheva / Averbukh won gold at the 2002 World Championships and at the 2003 European Championships. They retired from competition at the end of the 2002–2003 season.

Personal life 
Lobacheva and Averbukh married in 1995. Their son, Martin, was born in 2004. They divorced in 2007.

Programs 
(with Averbukh)

Results

With Averbukh

With Pospelov

References

External links 

 
 Official website of Lobacheva and Averbukh

1973 births
Living people
Russian female ice dancers
Figure skaters at the 2002 Winter Olympics
Figure skaters at the 1998 Winter Olympics
Olympic figure skaters of Russia
Olympic silver medalists for Russia
Figure skaters from Moscow
Olympic medalists in figure skating
World Figure Skating Championships medalists
European Figure Skating Championships medalists
Medalists at the 2002 Winter Olympics
Universiade medalists in figure skating
Goodwill Games medalists in figure skating
Season-end world number one figure skaters
Universiade gold medalists for Russia
Competitors at the 1995 Winter Universiade
Competitors at the 1994 Goodwill Games